Catherine Marsal (born 20 January 1971) is a French former racing cyclist. She has been World Champion four times and raced professionally around the world. At the age of 17 she was selected for the French Olympic Team for the first time. Since then, she represented her native country at four Summer Olympics: 1988, 1992, 1996, and 2000.

Marsal retired from cycling in 2005 when she was recruited by Team SATS Cycling to become sports director for the Danish team. The team became number one on the UCI ranking. In April 2015 Marsal was hired by the Danish Cycling Union to be the national coach of the Danish female cycling team.

Marsal currently works as a directeur sportif for UCI Women's Continental Team .

Personal life
Marsal is married and lives in Copenhagen. She gave birth to a son in 2013.

Palmares

1987 
1st  Road Race, UCI Junior Road World Championships
2nd Individual pursuit, UCI Junior Track Cycling World Championships

1988 
1st  Individual pursuit, UCI Junior Track Cycling World Championships
1st  Overall Tour de Bretagne
3rd Points race, National Track Championships
10th Olympic Games Time Trial

1989 
1st  Overall Tour de Bretagne
UCI Road World Championships
2nd Road Race
3rd Team Time Trial
2nd Individual pursuit, National Track Championships

1990 
1st  Road Race, UCI Road World Championships
1st  Road Race, National Road Championships
1st  Overall Giro d'Italia Femminile
1st  Overall Tour de l'Aude Cycliste Féminin
1st  Overall Tour of Norway
1st Stage 7
4th Tour de Okinawa

1991 
1st  Team Time Trial, UCI Road World Championships
2nd Overall Tour de l'Aude Cycliste Féminin

1992 
2nd Team Time Trial, UCI Road World Championships
2nd Coppa delle Nazioni

1993 
2nd Road Race, National Road Championships

1994 
1st  Overall Tour de l'Aude Cycliste Féminin
1st Stage 8
1st Calan Road Race
2nd Overall Tour de Bretagne
2nd Overall Tour du Finistère
1st Prologue, Stages 1 & 4

1995 
Hour record 
1st Stage 8 Grande Boucle Féminine Internationale
2nd Road Race, UCI Road World Championships
National Road Championships
2nd Road Race
2nd Time Trial
National Track Championships
2nd Individual pursuit
2nd Points race

1996 
1st  Road Race, National Road Championships
National Track Championships
3rd Individual pursuit
3rd Points race
3rd Overall Tour de l'Aude Cycliste Féminin
10th Road Race, UCI Road World Championships

1997 
National Road Championships
1st  Time Trial
3rd Road Race
National Track Championships
1st  Individual pursuit
1st  Points race
2nd Kampioenschap van Vlaanderen
3rd Road Race, UCI Road World Championships

1998 
2nd Trophée International de Saint-Amand-Mont-Rond
3rd Overall Tour de l'Aude Cycliste Féminin
3rd La Flèche Wallonne

1999 
1st  Points Race, National Track Championships
2nd Time Trial, National Road Championships
3rd Ronde van Drenthe

2000 
2nd Road Race, National Road Championships
2nd Boucles Nontronnaises

2001 
3rd Road Race, National Road Championships

2002 
1st Stage 1 Vuelta Castilla y Leon
1st Stage 3 Tour de l'Aude Cycliste Féminin

2004 
3rd GP des Nations

References

External links

1971 births
Living people
French female cyclists
Cyclists at the 1988 Summer Olympics
Cyclists at the 1992 Summer Olympics
Cyclists at the 1996 Summer Olympics
Cyclists at the 2000 Summer Olympics
Olympic cyclists of France
Sportspeople from Metz
UCI Road World Champions (women)
Cyclists from Grand Est
20th-century French women
21st-century French women